George Baxter (1792–) was an English cricketer who was associated with Surrey and made his first-class debut in 1830. He was born at Hascombe in Surrey in 1792.

References

1792 births
Year of death unknown
English cricketers
English cricketers of 1826 to 1863
Surrey cricketers